James Taylor (1820  – 19 October 1895) was a member of the Queensland Legislative Council and the Queensland Legislative Assembly.

Early life and pastoral career
Taylor was born in London, England in 1820 to John William Taylor, merchant, and his wife Ann (née Fielder).
 
He probably arrived in Sydney on board the James Pattison and spent the next few years gaining pastoral experience before heading to the Darling Downs with sheep in 1848. He found work in Cecil Plains, becoming Henry Stuart Russell's head stockman before becoming a partner 1856 and sole owner in 1859.

Using the property as a fattening and disposal centre for western sheep, he began to prosper and by 1880 the 147,310 acre freehold property held almost 100,000 sheep and was supplemented by Dunmore, Goodar and Coomrith stations on the Western Downs and Mount Marlow on the Barcoo River.

Political career
Taylor was elected to the first Queensland Parliament in 1860, winning the seat of Western Downs.  Appointed Secretary for Public Lands in 1869, he administered his office with little regard for the good of the public. He withheld large areas of Cecil Plains from selection until 1870 when he suddenly sold them to himself. These actions were one of the reasons for his resignation as Secretary in May 1870, and in September of that same year he resigned as member for Western Downs to stand for the seat of Drayton and Toowoomba but was unsuccessful.

He was not long out of politics long before he was appointed a member of the Queensland Legislative Council in November 1871 where he proved to be one of the most vigorous and obstructive of the squatting rearguard. He resigned after almost 10 years service in January 1881 to once again stand for the seat of Drayton and Toowoomba but was once again unsuccessful. He was reappointed to the Queensland Legislative Council in July 1881 and served until his retirement due to ill health in August 1893.

He also served on the Toowoomba Town Council, being Mayor of Toowoomba in 1890.

Business life
Taylor was a director of several companies including the Queensland Mercantile and Agency Co, the Land Bank of Queensland, and the Queensland Brewing Co.

He was also a trustee for the Queensland Turf Club, the Toowoomba School of Arts, the Royal Agricultural Society, and the Queensland Club.

Personal life
In April 1850, Taylor married Sarah Boulton in Drayton and together they had nine children. Known as the King of Toowoomba he died at his home, Clifford House in Toowoomba in 1895 and was buried in Drayton and Toowoomba Cemetery.

Legacy 
His home, Clifford House, was listed on the Queensland Heritage Register in 1992.

References

Members of the Queensland Legislative Assembly
Members of the Queensland Legislative Council
1820 births
1895 deaths
Politicians from London
English emigrants to Australia
Burials in Drayton and Toowoomba Cemetery
19th-century Australian politicians
19th-century squatters